The Danish Institute for International Studies (DIIS) is a public institute for independent research and analysis of international affairs, financed primarily by the Danish state. DIIS conducts and communicates multidisciplinary research on globalisation, security, development and foreign policy.

DIIS has approximately 100 employees, comprising both research and support staff. Researchers have different academic backgrounds, mostly in social studies, international development studies, military studies and anthropology. DIIS contributes to the education of researchers both at home and in developing countries and welcomes practitioners from relevant ministries for prolonged periods of time, in order to qualify the knowledge of how DIIS research is used outside of academic circles. 

The institute performs and communicates basic research, research-based consultancy and commissioned work. Commissioned policy work can be requested by the Danish Parliament, its ministries, NGOs and other clients. DIIS participates in academic networks and publishes in high-ranking academic journals. 

The legal foundation for DIIS states, that the institute must continuously assess Denmark's foreign policy and political situation and inform the Danish media, politicians and the public about its findings.

DIIS was founded as an independent institution by law nr. 411 of 6 June 2002, and the Institute commenced activities on 1 January 2003. DIIS was created as a fusion of the former Center for Freds og Konfliktforskning (COPRI), Center for Udviklingsforskning (CUF), Dansk Center for Holocaust og Folkedrabsstudier (DCHF) og Dansk Udenrigspolitisk Institut (DUPI). The current law is law nr 554 of 18 June 2012.

DIIS is led by a board primarily from academia, in order to secure that the institute fulfils its scholarly obligations. The director is appointed by the board and advised by an internal Research Committee on strategic planning of the institute's research. DIIS is committed to the Principles of Research Integrity.

According to the law, the purpose of DIIS is to:

 Conduct, promote and coordinate independent research on international affairs.
 Perform research and analysis as requested by the Danish Parliament, the government or on own initiative and follow the international development in order to evaluate Denmark's foreign- and security political situation in a broad political and economical understanding, including Denmark's place in relation to development policies.
 Communicate research results, analysis and knowledge as well as conduct documentation and information activities including a public library, on international relations.
 Participate in the education of researchers through cooperation with other research institutes, including support the development of research capacity in developing countries, as well as supporting further education for the users of the Institute.
 Act as connector between Danish and international research environments within research on international affairs.

The Think Tanks and Civil Societies Program at the University of Pennsylvania ranks DIIS in the annual Go To Think Tank Index. The institute is ranked consistently high, in 2017 DIIS was ranked fifth among research institutes in Western Europe, and in 2018 the index improved DIIS’ ranking to fourth in Western Europe.

References

https://repository.upenn.edu/think_tanks/

External links
 

Foreign policy and strategy think tanks
Think tanks established in 2003